John R. Cash (born J. R. Cash; February 26, 1932 – September 12, 2003) was an American country singer-songwriter. Most of Cash's music contained themes of sorrow, moral tribulation, and redemption, especially in the later stages of his career. He was known for his deep, calm bass-baritone voice, the distinctive sound of his Tennessee Three backing band characterized by train-like chugging guitar rhythms, a rebelliousness coupled with an increasingly somber and humble demeanor, free prison concerts, and a trademark all-black stage wardrobe, which earned him the nickname the "Man in Black".

Born to poor cotton farmers in Kingsland, Arkansas, Cash rose to fame during the mid-1950s in the burgeoning rockabilly scene in Memphis, Tennessee, after serving four years in the Air Force. He traditionally began his concerts by simply introducing himself, "Hello, I'm Johnny Cash", followed by "Folsom Prison Blues", one of his signature songs. His other signature songs include "I Walk the Line", "Ring of Fire", "Get Rhythm", and "Man in Black". He also recorded humorous numbers like "One Piece at a Time" and "A Boy Named Sue", a duet with his future wife June called "Jackson" (followed by many further duets after their wedding), and railroad songs such as "Hey, Porter", "Orange Blossom Special", and "Rock Island Line". During the last stage of his career, he covered songs by contemporary rock artists; among his most notable covers were "Hurt" by Nine Inch Nails, "Rusty Cage" by Soundgarden, and "Personal Jesus" by Depeche Mode.

Cash is one of the best-selling music artists of all time, having sold more than 90 million records worldwide. His genre-spanning music embraced country, rock and roll, rockabilly, blues, folk, and gospel sounds. This crossover appeal earned him the rare honor of being inducted into the Country Music, Rock and Roll, and Gospel Music Halls of Fame. His music career was dramatized in the 2005 biopic Walk the Line, in which Cash was portrayed by American film actor Joaquin Phoenix.

Early life 

Cash was born J. R. Cash in Kingsland, Arkansas, on February 26, 1932, to Carrie Cloveree (née Rivers) and Ray Cash. He had three older siblings, named Roy, Margaret Louise, and Jack, and three younger siblings, named Reba, Joanne, and Tommy (who also became a successful country artist). He was primarily of English and Scottish descent. His paternal grandmother also claimed Cherokee ancestry, though a DNA test of Cash's daughter Rosanne found she has no known Native American markers. He traced his Scottish surname to 11th-century Fife after meeting with the then-laird of Falkland, Major Michael Crichton-Stuart. Cash Loch and other locations in Fife bear the name of his family. He is a distant cousin of British Conservative politician Sir William Cash. His mother wanted to name him John and his father preferred to name him Ray, so J. R. ended up being the only compromise they could agree on. When Cash enlisted in the Air Force, he was not permitted to use initials as a first name, so he changed it to John R. Cash. In 1955, when signing with Sun Records, he started using the name Johnny Cash.

In March 1935, when Cash was three years old, the family settled in Dyess, Arkansas, a New Deal colony established to give poor families the opportunity to work land that they may later own. From the age of five, he worked in cotton fields with his family, singing with them as they worked. The Cash farm in Dyess experienced a flood, which led Cash later to write the song "Five Feet High and Rising". His family's economic and personal struggles during the Great Depression gave him a lifelong sympathy for the poor and working class, and inspired many of his songs.

In 1944, Cash's older brother Jack, with whom he was close, was cut almost in two by an unguarded table saw at work and died a week later. According to Cash's autobiography, he, his mother, and Jack all had a sense of foreboding about that day; his mother urged Jack to skip work and go fishing with Cash, but Jack insisted on working as the family needed the money. Cash often spoke of the guilt he felt over the incident, and spoke of looking forward to "meeting [his] brother in Heaven".

Cash's early memories were dominated by gospel music and radio. Taught guitar by his mother and a childhood friend, Cash began playing and writing songs at the age of 12. When young, Cash had a high-tenor voice, before becoming a bass-baritone after his voice changed. In high school, he sang on a local radio station. Decades later, he released an album of traditional gospel songs called My Mother's Hymn Book. He was also significantly influenced by traditional Irish music, which he heard performed weekly by Dennis Day on the Jack Benny radio program.

Cash enlisted in the Air Force on July 7, 1950. After basic training at Lackland Air Force Base and technical training at Brooks Air Force Base, both in San Antonio, Texas, Cash was assigned to the 12th Radio Squadron Mobile of the U.S. Air Force Security Service at Landsberg, West Germany. He worked as a Morse code operator intercepting Soviet Army transmissions. While working this job, Cash was allegedly the first American to be given the news of Joseph Stalin’s death (supplied via Morse code). His daughter, Rosanne, backed up the claim, saying that Cash had recounted the story many times over the years. While at Landsberg he created his first band, "The Landsberg Barbarians". On July 3, 1954, he was honorably discharged as a staff sergeant, and he returned to Texas. During his military service, he acquired a distinctive scar on the right side of his jaw as a result of surgery to remove a cyst.

Career

Early career 

In 1954, Cash and his first wife Vivian moved to Memphis, Tennessee, where he had sold appliances while studying to be a radio announcer. At night, he played with guitarist Luther Perkins and bassist Marshall Grant. Perkins and Grant were known as the Tennessee Two. Cash worked up the courage to visit the Sun Records studio, hoping to get a recording contract. He auditioned for Sam Phillips by singing mostly gospel songs, only to learn from the producer that he no longer recorded gospel music. Phillips was rumored to have told Cash to "go home and sin, then come back with a song I can sell", although in a 2002 interview, Cash denied that Phillips made any such comment. Cash eventually won over the producer with new songs delivered in his early rockabilly style. In 1955, Cash made his first recordings at Sun, "Hey Porter" and "Cry! Cry! Cry!", which were released in late June and met with success on the country hit parade.

On December 4, 1956, Elvis Presley dropped in on Phillips while Carl Perkins was in the studio cutting new tracks, with Jerry Lee Lewis backing him on piano. Cash was also in the studio, and the four started an impromptu jam session. Phillips left the tapes running and the recordings, almost half of which were gospel songs, survived. They have since been released under the title Million Dollar Quartet. In Cash: the Autobiography, Cash wrote that he was the farthest from the microphone and sang in a higher pitch to blend in with Elvis.

Cash's next record, "Folsom Prison Blues", made the country top five. His "I Walk the Line" became number one on the country charts and entered the pop charts top 20. "Home of the Blues" followed, recorded in July 1957. That same year, Cash became the first Sun artist to release a long-playing album. Although he was Sun's most consistently selling and prolific artist at that time, Cash felt constrained by his contract with the small label. Phillips did not want Cash to record gospel and was paying him a 3% royalty rather than the standard rate of 5%. Presley had already left Sun and, Phillips was focusing most of his attention and promotion on Lewis.

In 1958, Cash left Phillips to sign a lucrative offer with Columbia Records. His single "Don't Take Your Guns to Town" became one of his biggest hits, and he recorded a collection of gospel songs for his second album for Columbia. However, Cash left behind a sufficient backlog of recordings with Sun that Phillips continued to release new singles and albums featuring previously unreleased material until as late as 1964. Cash was in the unusual position of having new releases out on two labels concurrently. Sun's 1960 release, a cover of "Oh Lonesome Me", made it to number 13 on the C&W charts.

Early in his career, Cash was given the teasing nickname "the Undertaker" by fellow artists because of his habit of wearing black clothes. He said he chose them because they were easier to keep looking clean on long tours.

In the early 1960s, Cash toured with the Carter Family, which by this time regularly included Mother Maybelle's daughters, Anita, June, and Helen. June later recalled admiring him from afar during these tours. In the 1960s, he appeared on Pete Seeger's short-lived television series Rainbow Quest. He also acted in, and wrote and sang the opening theme for, a 1961 film entitled Five Minutes to Live, later re-released as Door-to-door Maniac.

Cash's career was handled by Saul Holiff, a London, Ontario, promoter. Their relationship was the subject of Saul's son's biopic My Father and the Man in Black.

Outlaw image 
As his career was taking off in the late 1950s, Cash started drinking heavily and became addicted to amphetamines and barbiturates. For a brief time, he shared an apartment in Nashville with Waylon Jennings, who was deeply addicted to amphetamines. Cash would use the stimulants to stay awake during tours. Friends joked about his "nervousness" and erratic behavior, many ignoring the warning signs of his worsening drug addiction.

Although he was in many ways spiraling out of control, Cash could still deliver hits due to his frenetic creativity. His rendition of "Ring of Fire" was a crossover hit, reaching number one on the country charts and entering the top 20 on the pop charts. It was originally performed by June's sister, but the signature mariachi-style horn arrangement was provided by Cash. He said that it had come to him in a dream. Vivian Liberto claimed a different version of the origins of "Ring of Fire". In her book, I Walked the Line: My Life with Johnny, Liberto says that Cash gave Carter half the songwriting credit for monetary reasons.

In June 1965, Cash's camper caught fire during a fishing trip with his nephew Damon Fielder in Los Padres National Forest in California, triggering a forest fire that burned several hundred acres and nearly caused his death. Cash claimed that the fire was caused by sparks from a defective exhaust system on his camper, but Fielder thinks that Cash started a fire to stay warm and in his drugged condition failed to notice the fire getting out of control. When the judge asked Cash why he did it, Cash said, "I didn't do it, my truck did, and it's dead, so you can't question it." The fire destroyed , burned the foliage off three mountains and drove off 49 of the refuge's 53 endangered California condors. Cash was unrepentant and claimed, "I don't care about your damn yellow buzzards." The federal government sued him and was awarded $125,172. Cash eventually settled the case and paid $82,001.

Although Cash cultivated a romantic outlaw image, he never served a prison sentence. Despite landing in jail seven times for misdemeanors, he stayed only one night on each stay. On May 11, 1965, he was arrested in Starkville, Mississippi, for trespassing late at night onto private property to pick flowers. (He used this to write the song "Starkville City Jail", which he discussed on his live At San Quentin album.) While on tour that year, he was arrested October 4 in El Paso, Texas, by a narcotics squad. The officers suspected he was smuggling heroin from Mexico, but found instead 688 Dexedrine capsules (amphetamines) and 475 Equanil (sedatives or tranquilizers) tablets hidden inside his guitar case. Because the pills were prescription drugs rather than illegal narcotics, Cash received a suspended sentence. He posted a $1,500 bond and was released until his arraignment.

In this period of the mid-1960s, Cash released a number of concept albums. His Bitter Tears (1964) was devoted to spoken word and songs addressing the plight of Native Americans and mistreatment by the government. While initially reaching charts, this album met with resistance from some fans and radio stations, which rejected its controversial take on social issues. In 2011, a book was published about it, leading to a re-recording of the songs by contemporary artists and the making of a documentary film about Cash's efforts with the album. This film was aired on PBS in February and November 2016. His Sings the Ballads of the True West (1965) was an experimental double record, mixing authentic frontier songs with Cash's spoken narration.

Reaching a low with his severe drug addiction and destructive behavior, Cash was divorced from his first wife and had performances cancelled, but he continued to find success. In 1967, Cash's duet with June Carter, "Jackson", won a Grammy Award.

Cash was last arrested in 1967 in Walker County, Georgia, after police found he was carrying a bag of prescription pills and was in a car accident. Cash attempted to bribe a local deputy, who turned the money down. He was jailed for the night in LaFayette, Georgia. Sheriff Ralph Jones released him after giving him a long talk, warning him about the danger of his behavior and wasted potential. Cash credited that experience with helping him turn around and save his life. He later returned to LaFayette to play a benefit concert; it attracted 12,000 people (the city population was less than 9,000 at the time) and raised $75,000 for the high school. Reflecting on his past in a 1997 interview, Cash noted: "I was taking the pills for awhile, and then the pills started taking me." June, Maybelle, and Ezra Carter moved into Cash's mansion for a month to help him get off drugs. Cash proposed onstage to June on February 22, 1968, at a concert at the London Gardens in London, Ontario, Canada. The couple married a week later (on March 1) in Franklin, Kentucky. She had agreed to marry Cash after he had "cleaned up."

Cash's journey included rediscovery of his Christian faith. He took an "altar call" in Evangel Temple, a small church in the Nashville area, pastored by Reverend Jimmie Rodgers Snow, son of country music legend Hank Snow. According to Marshall Grant, though, Cash did not completely stop using amphetamines in 1968. Cash did not end all drug use until 1970, staying drug-free for a period of seven years. Grant claims that the birth of Cash's son, John Carter Cash, inspired Cash to end his dependence.

Cash began using amphetamines again in 1977. By 1983, he was deeply addicted again and became a patient at the Betty Ford Clinic in Rancho Mirage for treatment. He stayed off drugs for several years, but relapsed. By 1989, he was dependent and entered Nashville's Cumberland Heights Alcohol and Drug Treatment Center. In 1992, he started care at the Loma Linda Behavioral Medicine Center in Loma Linda, California, for his final rehabilitation treatment. (Several months later, his son followed him into this facility for treatment.)

Folsom and other prison concerts 
Cash began performing concerts at prisons in the late 1950s. He played his first famous prison concert on January 1, 1958, at San Quentin State Prison. These performances led to a pair of highly successful live albums, Johnny Cash at Folsom Prison (1968) and Johnny Cash at San Quentin (1969). Both live albums reached number one on Billboard country album music and the latter crossed over to reach the top of the Billboard pop album chart. In 1969, Cash became an international hit when he eclipsed even The Beatles by selling 6.5 million albums. In comparison, the prison concerts were much more successful than his later live albums such as Strawberry Cake recorded in London and Live at Madison Square Garden, which peaked at numbers 33 and 39 on the album charts, respectively.

The Folsom Prison record was introduced by a rendition of his "Folsom Prison Blues" while the San Quentin record included the crossover hit single "A Boy Named Sue", a Shel Silverstein-penned novelty song that reached number one on the country charts and number two on the U.S. top-10 pop charts.

Cash performed at the Österåker Prison in Sweden in 1972. The live album På Österåker (At Österåker) was released in 1973. "San Quentin" was recorded with Cash replacing "San Quentin" with "Österåker". In 1976, a concert at Tennessee State Prison was videotaped for TV broadcast, and received a belated CD release after Cash's death as A Concert Behind Prison Walls.

Activism for Native Americans 
Cash used his stardom and economic status to bring awareness to the issues surrounding the Native American people. Cash sang songs about indigenous humanity in an effort to confront the U.S. government. Many non-Native Americans stayed away from singing about these things. In 1965, Cash and June Carter appeared on Pete Seeger's TV show, Rainbow Quest, on which Cash explained his start as an activist for Native Americans: 

Columbia Music, the label for which Cash was recording then, was opposed to putting the song on his next album, considering it "too radical for the public". Cash singing songs of Indian tragedy and settler violence went radically against the mainstream of country music in the 1950s, which was dominated by the image of the righteous cowboy who simply makes the native's soil his own.

In 1964, coming off the chart success of his previous album I Walk the Line, he recorded the aforementioned album Bitter Tears: Ballads of the American Indian.

We're Still Here: Johnny Cash's Bitter Tears Revisited, a documentary by Antonino D'Ambrosio (author of A Heartland and a Guitar: Johnny Cash and the Making of Bitter Tears) tells the story of Johnny Cash's controversial concept album Bitter Tears: Ballads of the American Indian, covering the struggles of Native Americans. The film's DVD was released on August 21, 2018.

The album featured stories of a multitude of Indigenous peoples, mostly of their violent oppression by white settlers: the Pima ("The Ballad of Ira Hayes"), Navajo ("Navajo"), Apache ("Apache Tears"), Lakota ("Big Foot"), Seneca ("As Long as the Grass Shall Grow"), and Cherokee ("Talking Leaves"). Cash wrote three of the songs himself and one with the help of Johnny Horton, but the majority of the protest songs were written by folk artist Peter La Farge (son of activist and Pulitzer prizewinner Oliver La Farge), whom Cash met in New York in the 1960s and whom he admired for his activism. The album's single, "The Ballad of Ira Hayes" (about Ira Hayes, one of the six to raise the U.S. flag at Iwo Jima), was neglected by nonpolitical radio at the time, and the record label denied it any promotion due to its provocative protesting and "unappealing" nature. Cash faced resistance and was even urged by an editor of a country music magazine to leave the Country Music Association: "You and your crowd are just too intelligent to associate with plain country folks, country artists, and country DJs."

In reaction, on August 22, 1964, Cash posted a letter as an advertisement in Billboard, calling the record industry cowardly: "D.J.s – station managers – owners[...] where are your guts? I had to fight back when I realized that so many stations are afraid of Ira Hayes. Just one question: WHY??? Ira Hayes is strong medicine[...] So is Rochester, Harlem, Birmingham and Vietnam." Cash kept promoting the song himself and used his influence on radio disc jockeys he knew eventually to make the song climb to number three on the country charts, while the album rose to number two on the album charts.

Later, on The Johnny Cash Show, he continued telling stories of Native-American plight, both in song and through short films, such as the history of the Trail of Tears.

In 1966, in response to his activism, Cash was adopted by the Seneca Nation's Turtle Clan. He performed benefits in 1968 at the Rosebud Reservation, close to the historical landmark of the massacre at Wounded Knee, to raise money to help build a school. He also played at the D-Q University in the 1980s.

In 1970, Cash recorded a reading of John G. Burnett's 1890, 80th-birthday essay on Cherokee removal for the Historical Landmarks Association (Nashville).

The Johnny Cash Show
From June 1969 to March 1971, Cash starred in his own television show, The Johnny Cash Show, on the ABC network. Produced by Screen Gems, the show was performed at the Ryman Auditorium in Nashville. The Statler Brothers opened for him in every episode; the Carter Family and rockabilly legend Carl Perkins were also part of the regular show entourage. Cash also enjoyed booking mainstream performers as guests; including Linda Ronstadt in her first TV appearance, Neil Young, Louis Armstrong, Neil Diamond, Kenny Rogers and The First Edition (who appeared four times), James Taylor, Ray Charles, Roger Miller, Roy Orbison, Derek and the Dominos, Joni Mitchell, and Bob Dylan.

From September 15–18, 1969, in Albuquerque, New Mexico, he performed a series of four concerts at the New Mexico State Fair to promote the first season of The Johnny Cash Show. These live shows were produced with help from ABC and local concert producer Bennie Sanchez, during these sets Johnny Cash and Al Hurricane performed together. Also during The Johnny Cash Show era, he contributed the title song and other songs to the film Little Fauss and Big Halsy, which starred Robert Redford, Michael J. Pollard, and Lauren Hutton. The title song, "The Ballad of Little Fauss and Big Halsy", written by Carl Perkins, was nominated for a Golden Globe award in 1971.

Cash had first met with Dylan in the mid-1960s and became neighbors in the late 1960s in Woodstock, New York. Cash was enthusiastic about reintroducing the reclusive Dylan to his audience. Cash sang a duet with Dylan, "Girl from the North Country", on Dylan's country album Nashville Skyline and also wrote the album's Grammy-winning liner notes.

Another artist who received a major career boost from The Johnny Cash Show was Kris Kristofferson, who was beginning to make a name for himself as a singer-songwriter. During a live performance of Kristofferson's "Sunday Mornin' Comin' Down", Cash refused to change the lyrics to suit network executives, singing the song with its references to marijuana intact:

The closing program of The Johnny Cash Show was a gospel music special. Guests included the Blackwood Brothers, Mahalia Jackson, Stuart Hamblen, and Billy Graham.

The "Man in Black" 

By the early 1970s, Cash had established his public image as the "Man in Black". He regularly performed in entirely black suits with a long, black, knee-length coat. This outfit stood in contrast to the rhinestone suits and cowboy boots worn by most of the major country acts of his day.

Cash said he wore all black on behalf of the poor and hungry, the "prisoner who has long paid for his crime", and those who have been betrayed by age or drugs. He added, "With the Vietnam War as painful in my mind as it was in most other Americans, I wore it 'in mourning' for the lives that could have been' ... Apart from the Vietnam War being over, I don't see much reason to change my position ... The old are still neglected, the poor are still poor, the young are still dying before their time, and we're not making many moves to make things right. There's still plenty of darkness to carry off."

Initially, he and his band had worn black shirts because that was the only matching color they had among their various outfits. He wore other colors on stage early in his career, but he claimed to like wearing black both on and off stage. He stated that political reasons aside, he simply liked black as his on-stage color. The outdated US Navy's winter blue uniform used to be referred to by sailors as "Johnny Cashes", as the uniform's shirt, tie, and trousers are solid black.

In the mid-1970s, Cash's popularity and number of hit songs began to decline. He made commercials for Amoco and STP, an unpopular enterprise at the time of the 1970s energy crisis. In 1976, he made commercials for Lionel Trains, for which he also wrote the music. However, his first autobiography, Man in Black, was published in 1975 and sold 1.3 million copies. A second, Cash: The Autobiography, appeared in 1997.

Cash's friendship with Billy Graham led to his production of a film about the life of Jesus, Gospel Road: A Story of Jesus, which Cash co-wrote and narrated. It was released in 1973. Cash viewed the film as a statement of his personal faith rather than a means of proselytizing.

Cash and June Carter Cash appeared several times on the Billy Graham Crusade TV specials, and Cash continued to include gospel and religious songs on many of his albums, though Columbia declined to release A Believer Sings the Truth, a gospel double-LP Cash recorded in 1979 and which ended up being released on an independent label even with Cash still under contract to Columbia. On November 22, 1974, CBS ran his one-hour TV special entitled Riding The Rails, a musical history of trains.

He continued to appear on television, hosting Christmas specials on CBS in the late 1970s and early 1980s. Later television appearances included a starring role in an episode of Columbo, entitled "Swan Song". June and he appeared in an episode of Little House on the Prairie, entitled "The Collection". He gave a performance as abolitionist John Brown in the 1985 American Civil War television miniseries North and South. In the 1990s, Johnny and June appeared in Dr. Quinn, Medicine Woman in recurring roles.

He was friendly with every US president, starting with Richard Nixon. He was closest to Jimmy Carter, with whom he became close friends and who was a distant cousin of his wife, June.

When invited to perform at the White House for the first time in 1970, Richard Nixon's office requested that he play "Okie from Muskogee" (a satirical Merle Haggard song about people who despised hippies, young drug users and Vietnam war protesters), "Welfare Cadillac" (a Guy Drake song which chastises the integrity of welfare recipients), and "A Boy Named Sue". Cash declined to play the first two and instead selected other songs, including "The Ballad of Ira Hayes" and his own compositions, "What Is Truth" and "Man in Black". Cash wrote that the reasons for denying Nixon's song choices were not knowing them and having fairly short notice to rehearse them, rather than any political reason. However, Cash added, even if Nixon's office had given Cash enough time to learn and rehearse the songs, their choice of pieces that conveyed "antihippie and antiblack" sentiments might have backfired. In his remarks when introducing Cash, Nixon joked that one thing he had learned about him was one did not tell him what to sing.

Johnny Cash was the grand marshal of the United States Bicentennial parade. He wore a shirt from Nudie Cohn which sold for $25,000 in auction in 2010. After the parade he gave a concert at the Washington monument.

Highwaymen and departure from Columbia Records 

In 1980, Cash became the Country Music Hall of Fame's youngest living inductee at age 48, but during the 1980s, his records failed to make a major impact on the country charts, although he continued to tour successfully. In the mid-1980s, he recorded and toured with Waylon Jennings, Willie Nelson, and Kris Kristofferson as The Highwaymen, making three hit albums, which were released beginning with the originally titled Highwayman in 1985, followed by Highwaymen 2 in 1990, and concluding with Highwaymen – The Road Goes On Forever in 1995.

During that period, Cash appeared in a number of television films. In 1981, he starred in The Pride of Jesse Hallam, winning fine reviews for a film that called attention to adult illiteracy. In 1983, he appeared as a heroic sheriff in Murder in Coweta County, based on a real-life Georgia murder case, which co-starred Andy Griffith as his nemesis.

Cash relapsed into addiction after being administered painkillers for a serious abdominal injury in 1983 caused by an incident in which he was kicked and wounded by an ostrich on his farm.

At a hospital visit in 1988, this time to watch over Waylon Jennings (who was recovering from a heart attack), Jennings suggested that Cash have himself checked into the hospital for his own heart condition. Doctors recommended preventive heart surgery, and Cash underwent double bypass surgery in the same hospital. Both recovered, although Cash refused to use any prescription painkillers, fearing a relapse into dependency. Cash later claimed that during his operation, he had what is called a "near-death experience".

In 1984, Cash released a self-parody recording titled "The Chicken in Black" about Cash's brain being transplanted into a chicken and Cash receiving a bank robber's brain in return. Biographer Robert Hilburn, in his 2013 book Johnny Cash: The Life, disputes the claim made that Cash chose to record an intentionally poor song in protest of Columbia's treatment of him. On the contrary, Hilburn writes, it was Columbia that presented Cash with the song, which Cash – who had previously scored major chart hits with comedic material such as "A Boy Named Sue" and "One Piece at a Time" – accepted enthusiastically, performing the song live on stage and filming a comedic music video in which he dresses up in a superhero-like bank-robber costume. According to Hilburn, Cash's enthusiasm for the song waned after Waylon Jennings told Cash he looked "like a buffoon" in the music video (which was showcased during Cash's 1984 Christmas TV special), and Cash subsequently demanded that Columbia withdraw the music video from broadcast and recall the single from stores—interrupting its bona fide chart success—and termed the venture "a fiasco."

Between 1981 and 1984, he recorded several sessions with famed countrypolitan producer Billy Sherrill (who also produced "The Chicken in Black"), which were shelved; they would be released by Columbia's sister label, Legacy Recordings, in 2014 as Out Among the Stars. Around this time, Cash also recorded an album of gospel recordings that ended up being released by another label around the time of his departure from Columbia (this due to Columbia closing down its Priority Records division that was to have released the recordings).

After more unsuccessful recordings were released between 1984 and 1985, Cash left Columbia.

In 1986, Cash returned to Sun Studios in Memphis to team up with Roy Orbison, Jerry Lee Lewis, and Carl Perkins to create the album Class of '55; according to Hilburn, Columbia still had Cash under contract at the time, so special arrangements had to be made to allow him to participate. Also in 1986, Cash published his only novel, Man in White, a book about Saul and his conversion to become the Apostle Paul. He recorded Johnny Cash Reads The Complete New Testament in 1990.

American Recordings 

After Columbia Records dropped Cash from his recording contract, he had a short and unsuccessful stint with Mercury Records from 1987 to 1991. During this time, he recorded an album of new versions of some of his best-known Sun and Columbia hits, as well as Water from the Wells of Home, a duets album that paired him with, among others, his children Rosanne Cash and John Carter Cash, as well as Paul McCartney. A one-off Christmas album recorded for Delta Records followed his Mercury contract.

Though Cash would never have another chart hit from 1991 until his death, his career was rejuvenated in the 1990s, leading to popularity with an audience which was not traditionally considered interested in country music. In 1988, British post-punk musicians Marc Riley (formerly of the Fall) and Jon Langford (the Mekons) put together 'Til Things Are Brighter, a tribute album featuring mostly British-based indie-rock acts' interpretations of Cash's songs. Cash was enthusiastic about the project, telling Langford that it was a "morale booster"; Rosanne Cash later said "he felt a real connection with those musicians and very validated ... It was very good for him: he was in his element. He absolutely understood what they were tapping into, and loved it". The album attracted press attention on both sides of the Atlantic. In 1991, he sang a version of "Man in Black" for the Christian punk band One Bad Pig's album I Scream Sunday. In 1993, he sang "The Wanderer", the closing track of U2's album Zooropa. According to Rolling Stone writer Adam Gold, "The Wanderer" – written for Cash by Bono, "defies both the U2 and Cash canons, combining rhythmic and textural elements of Nineties synth-pop with a Countrypolitan lament fit for the closing credits of a Seventies western."

No longer sought-after by major labels, he was offered a contract with producer Rick Rubin's American Recordings label, which had recently been rebranded from Def American, under which name it was better known for rap and hard rock. Under Rubin's supervision, he recorded American Recordings (1994) in his living room, accompanied only by his Martin Dreadnought guitar – one of many Cash played throughout his career. The album featured covers of contemporary artists selected by Rubin. The album had a great deal of critical and commercial success, winning a Grammy for Best Contemporary Folk Album. Cash wrote that his reception at the 1994 Glastonbury Festival was one of the highlights of his career. This was the beginning of a decade of music industry accolades and commercial success. He teamed up with Brooks & Dunn to contribute "Folsom Prison Blues" to the AIDS benefit album Red Hot + Country produced by the Red Hot Organization. On the same album, he performed Bob Dylan's  "Forever Young."

Cash and his wife appeared on a number of episodes of the television series Dr. Quinn, Medicine Woman. He also lent his voice for a cameo role in The Simpsons episode "El Viaje Misterioso de Nuestro Jomer (The Mysterious Voyage of Homer)", as the "Space Coyote" that guides Homer Simpson on a spiritual quest.

Cash was joined by guitarist Kim Thayil of Soundgarden, bassist Krist Novoselic of Nirvana, and drummer Sean Kinney of Alice in Chains for a cover of Willie Nelson's "Time of the Preacher", featured on the tribute album Twisted Willie, released in January 1996.

In 1996, Cash collaborated with Tom Petty and the Heartbreakers on Unchained (also known as American Recordings II), which won the Best Country Album Grammy in 1998. The album was produced by Rick Rubin with Sylvia Massy engineering and mixing. A majority of Unchained was recorded at Sound City Studios and featured guest appearances by Lindsey Buckingham, Mick Fleetwood, and Marty Stuart. Believing he did not explain enough of himself in his 1975 autobiography Man in Black, he wrote Cash: The Autobiography in 1997.

Later years and death 

In 1997, during a trip to New York City, Cash was diagnosed with the neurodegenerative disease Shy–Drager syndrome, a form of multiple system atrophy. According to biographer Robert Hilburn, the disease was originally misdiagnosed as Parkinson's disease, and Cash even announced to his audience that he had Parkinson's after nearly collapsing on stage in Flint, Michigan, on October 25, 1997. Soon afterwards, his diagnosis was changed to Shy–Drager, and Cash was told he had about 18 months to live. The diagnosis was later again altered to autonomic neuropathy associated with diabetes. The illness forced Cash to curtail his touring. He was hospitalized in 1998 with severe pneumonia, which damaged his lungs.

During the last stage of his career, Cash released the albums American III: Solitary Man (2000) and American IV: The Man Comes Around (2002). American IV included cover songs by several late 20th-century rock artists, notably "Hurt" by Nine Inch Nails and "Personal Jesus" by Depeche Mode. Trent Reznor of Nine Inch Nails commented that he was initially skeptical about Cash's plan to cover "Hurt", but was later impressed and moved by the rendition. The video for "Hurt" received critical and popular acclaim, including a Grammy Award.

June Carter Cash died on May 15, 2003, aged 71. June had told Cash to keep working, so he continued to record, completing 60 songs in the last four months of his life. He even performed surprise shows at the Carter Family Fold outside Bristol, Virginia. At the July 5, 2003, concert (his last public performance), before singing "Ring of Fire", Cash read a statement that he had written shortly before taking the stage:

Cash continued to record until shortly before his death. "When June died, it tore him up", Rick Rubin recalled. "He said to me, 'You have to keep me working because I will die if I don't have something to do.' He was in a wheelchair by then and we set him up at his home in Virginia… I couldn't listen to those recordings for two years after he died and it was heartbreaking when we did." Cash's final recordings were made on August 21, 2003, and consisted of "Like the 309", which appeared on American V: A Hundred Highways in 2006, and the final song he completed, "Engine 143", recorded for his son John Carter Cash's planned Carter Family tribute album.

While being hospitalized at Baptist Hospital in Nashville, Cash died of complications from diabetes at around 2:00 am Central Time on September 12, 2003, aged 71—less than four months after his wife. He was buried next to her at Hendersonville Memory Gardens near his home in Hendersonville, Tennessee.

Personal life 

On July 18, 1951, while in Air Force basic training, Cash met 17-year-old Italian-American Vivian Liberto at a roller skating rink in San Antonio, Texas. They dated for three weeks until Cash was deployed to West Germany for a three-year tour. During that time, the couple exchanged hundreds of love letters. On August 7, 1954, one month after his discharge, they were married at St. Ann's Roman Catholic Church in San Antonio. They had four daughters: Rosanne, Kathy, Cindy, and Tara. In 1961, Cash moved his family to a hilltop home overlooking Casitas Springs, California. He had previously moved his parents to the area to run a small trailer park called the Johnny Cash Trailer Park. His drinking led to several run-ins with local law enforcement. Liberto later said that she had filed for divorce in 1966 because of Cash's severe drug and alcohol abuse, as well as his constant touring, his repeated acts of adultery with other women, and his close relationship with singer June Carter. Their four daughters were then raised by their mother.

Cash met June of the famed Carter Family while on tour, and the two became infatuated with each other. In 1968, thirteen years after they first met backstage at the Grand Ole Opry, Cash proposed to June, during a live performance in London, Ontario. The couple married on March 1, 1968, in Franklin, Kentucky. They had one child together, John Carter Cash, born March 3, 1970. He was the only son for both Johnny and June. In addition to having his four daughters and John Carter, Cash also became stepfather to Carlene and Rosie, June's daughters from her first two marriages, to, respectively, honky-tonk singer Carl Smith, and former police officer, football player, and race-car driver Edwin "Rip" Nix. Cash and Carter continued to work, raise their child, create music, and tour together for 35 years until June's death in May 2003. Throughout their marriage, June attempted to keep Cash off amphetamines, often taking his drugs and flushing them down the toilet. June remained with him even throughout his multiple admissions for rehabilitation treatment and decades of drug addiction. After June's death in May 2003, Cash believed that his only reason for living was his music; he died only four months later.

Religious beliefs 
Cash was raised by his parents in the Southern Baptist denomination of Christianity. He was baptized in 1944 in the Tyronza River as a member of the Central Baptist Church of Dyess, Arkansas.

A troubled but devout Christian, Cash has been characterized as a "lens through which to view American contradictions and challenges." On May 9, 1971, he answered the altar call at Evangel Temple, an Assemblies of God congregation pastored by Jimmie R. Snow  with outreach to people in the music world.

Cash penned a Christian novel, Man in White in 1986 and in the introduction writes about a reporter, who, interested in Cash's religious beliefs, questioned whether the book is written from a Baptist, Catholic, or Jewish perspective. Cash replies "I'm a Christian. Don't put me in another box." 

In the mid-1970s, Cash and his wife, June, completed a course of study in the Bible through Christian International Bible College, culminating in a pilgrimage to Israel in November 1978. Around that time, he was ordained as a minister, and officiated at his daughter's wedding.  He often performed at Billy Graham Crusades. At a Tallahassee Crusade in 1986, June and Johnny sang his song "One of These Days I'm Gonna Sit Down and Talk to Paul".  At a performance in Arkansas in 1989, Johnny Cash spoke to attendees of his commitment to the salvation of drug dealers and alcoholics. He then sang, "Family Bible".

He recorded several gospel albums and made a spoken-word recording of the entire New King James Version of the New Testament.  Cash declared he was "the biggest sinner of them all", and viewed himself overall as a complicated and contradictory man.  Accordingly,  Cash is said to have "contained multitudes", and has been deemed "the philosopher-prince of American country music."

Cash is credited with having converted actor and singer John Schneider to Christianity.

Legacy 

Cash nurtured and defended artists (such as Bob Dylan) on the fringes of what was acceptable in country music even while serving as the country music establishment's most visible symbol. At an all-star concert which aired in 1999 on TNT, a diverse group of artists paid him tribute, including Dylan, Chris Isaak, Wyclef Jean, Norah Jones, Kris Kristofferson, Willie Nelson, Dom DeLuise, and U2. Cash himself appeared at the end and performed for the first time in more than a year. Two tribute albums were released shortly before his death; Kindred Spirits contains works from established artists, while Dressed in Black contains works from many lesser-known musicians.

In total, he wrote over 1,000 songs and released dozens of albums. A box set titled Unearthed was issued posthumously. It included four CDs of unreleased material recorded with Rubin, as well as a Best of Cash on American retrospective CD. The set also includes a 104-page book that discusses each track and features one of Cash's final interviews.

In 1999, Cash received the Grammy Lifetime Achievement Award. In 2004, Rolling Stone ranked Cash number 31 on their "100 Greatest Artists of All Time" list and No. 21 on their "100 Greatest Singers" list in 2010. In 2012, Rolling Stone ranked Cash's 1968 live album At Folsom Prison and 1994 studio album American Recordings at No. 88 and No. 366 in its list of the 500 greatest albums of all time.

In recognition of his lifelong support of SOS Children's Villages, his family invited friends and fans to donate to the Johnny Cash Memorial Fund in his memory. He had a personal link with the SOS village in Dießen, at the Ammersee Lake in Bavaria, near where he was stationed as a GI, and with the SOS village in Barrett Town, by Montego Bay, near his holiday home in Jamaica.

In January 2006, Cash's lakeside home on Caudill Drive in Hendersonville was sold to Bee Gees vocalist Barry Gibb and wife Linda for $2.3 million. On April 10, 2007, during major renovation works carried out for Gibb, a fire broke out at the house, spreading quickly due to a flammable wood preservative that had been used. The building was completely destroyed.

One of Cash's final collaborations with producer Rick Rubin, American V: A Hundred Highways, was released posthumously on July 4, 2006. The album debuted at number one on the Billboard Top 200 album chart for the week ending July 22, 2006. On February 23, 2010, three days before what would have been Cash's 78th birthday, the Cash Family, Rick Rubin, and Lost Highway Records released his second posthumous record, titled American VI: Ain't No Grave.

The main street in Hendersonville, Tennessee, Highway 31E, is known as "Johnny Cash Parkway". The Johnny Cash Museum, located in one of Cash's properties in Hendersonville until 2006, dubbed the House of Cash, was sold based on Cash's will. Prior to this, having been closed for a number of years, the museum had been featured in Cash's music video for "Hurt". The house subsequently burned down during the renovation by the new owner. A new museum, founded by Shannon and Bill Miller, opened April 26, 2013, in downtown Nashville.

On November 2–4, 2007, the Johnny Cash Flower Pickin' Festival was held in Starkville, Mississippi, where Cash had been arrested more than 40 years earlier and held overnight at the city jail on May 11, 1965. The incident inspired Cash to write the song "Starkville City Jail". The festival, where he was offered a symbolic posthumous pardon, honored Cash's life and music, and was expected to become an annual event.

JC Unit One, Johnny Cash's private tour bus from 1980 until 2003, was put on exhibit at the Rock and Roll Hall of Fame and Museum in Cleveland, Ohio, in 2007. The museum offers public tours of the bus on a seasonal basis (it is stored during the winter and not exhibited during those times).

A limited-edition Forever stamp honoring Cash went on sale June 5, 2013. The stamp features a promotional picture of Cash taken around the 1963 release of Ring of Fire: The Best of Johnny Cash.

On October 14, 2014, the City of Folsom unveiled phase 1 of the Johnny Cash Trail to the public with a dedication and ribbon-cutting ceremony attended by Rosanne Cash. Along the trail, eight larger-than-life public art pieces will tell the story of Johnny Cash, his connection to Folsom Prison, and his epic musical career. The artists responsible for the sculptures are Sacramento-based Romo Studios, LLC and the Fine Art Studio of Rotblatt Amrany, from Illinois.

In 2015, a new species of black tarantula was identified near Folsom Prison and named Aphonopelma johnnycashi in his honor.

In 2016, the Nashville Sounds Minor League Baseball team added the "Country Legends Race" to its between-innings entertainment. At the middle of the fifth inning, people in oversized foam caricature costumes depicting Cash, as well as George Jones, Reba McEntire, and Dolly Parton, race around the warning track at First Horizon Park from center field to the home plate side of the first base dugout.

On February 8, 2018, the album Forever Words was announced, putting music to poems that Cash had written and which were published in book form in 2016.

Johnny Cash's boyhood home in Dyess was listed in the National Register of Historic Places on May 2, 2018, as "Farm No. 266, Johnny Cash Boyhood Home."

The Arkansas Country Music Awards honored Johnny Cash's legacy with the Lifetime Achievement award on June 3, 2018. The ceremony was held that same date, which was a Monday night at the University of Arkansas at Little Rock in Little Rock, Arkansas. The nominations took place in early 2018.

In 2019, Sheryl Crow released a duet with Cash on her song "Redemption Day" for her final album Threads. Crow, who had originally written and recorded the song in 1996, recorded new vocals and added them to those of Cash, who recorded the song for his American VI: Ain't No Grave album.

In April 2019, it was announced that the state of Arkansas would place a statue of Cash in the National Statuary Hall in an effort to represent the modern history of Arkansas. The Governor of Arkansas, Asa Hutchinson, stated that Cash's contributions to music made him an appropriate figure to tell the story of the state.

Portrayals 
Country singer Mark Collie portrayed Cash in John Lloyd Miller's award-winning 1999 short film I Still Miss Someone.

In November 2005, Walk the Line, a biographical film about Cash's life, was released in the United States to considerable commercial success and critical acclaim. The film featured Joaquin Phoenix as Johnny (for which he was nominated for the Academy Award for Best Actor) and Reese Witherspoon as June (for which she won the Academy Award for Best Actress). Phoenix and Witherspoon also won the Golden Globe for Best Actor in a Musical or Comedy and Best Actress in a Musical or Comedy, respectively. They both performed their own vocals in the film (with their version of "Jackson" being released as a single), and Phoenix learned to play guitar for the role. Phoenix received a Grammy Award for his contributions to the soundtrack. John Carter Cash, the son of Johnny and June, served as an executive producer.

On March 12, 2006, Ring of Fire, a jukebox musical of the Cash oeuvre, debuted on Broadway at the Ethel Barrymore Theater, but closed due to harsh reviews and disappointing sales on April 30. Million Dollar Quartet, a musical portraying the early Sun recording sessions involving Cash, Elvis Presley, Jerry Lee Lewis, and Carl Perkins, debuted on Broadway on April 11, 2010. Actor Lance Guest portrayed Cash. The musical was nominated for three awards at the 2010 Tony Awards and won one.

Robert Hilburn, veteran Los Angeles Times pop music critic, the journalist who accompanied Cash in his 1968 Folsom prison tour, and interviewed Cash many times throughout his life including months before his death, published a 688-page biography with 16 pages of photographs in 2013. The meticulously reported biography is said to have filled in the 80% of Cash's life that was unknown, including details about Cash's battles with addiction and infidelity.

Awards and honors 

Cash received multiple Country Music Association Awards, Grammys, and other awards, in categories ranging from vocal and spoken performances to album notes and videos. In a career that spanned almost five decades, Cash was the personification of country music to many people around the world. Cash was a musician who was not defined by a single genre. He recorded songs that could be considered rock and roll, blues, rockabilly, folk, and gospel, and exerted an influence on each of those genres.

His diversity was evidenced by his presence in five major music halls of fame: the Nashville Songwriters Hall of Fame (1977), the Country Music Hall of Fame (1980), the Rock and Roll Hall of Fame (1992), GMA's Gospel Music Hall of Fame (2010). and the Memphis Music Hall of Fame (2013). Marking his death in 2003, Rolling Stone stated other than Elvis Presley Cash was the only artist inducted as a performer into both the Country Music Hall of Fame and the Rock and Roll Hall of Fame.

His contributions to the genre have been recognized by the Rockabilly Hall of Fame. Cash received the Kennedy Center Honors in 1996 and stated that his induction into the Country Music Hall of Fame in 1980 was his greatest professional achievement. In 2001, he was awarded the National Medal of Arts. "Hurt" was nominated for six VMAs at the 2003 MTV Video Music Awards. The only VMA the video won was that for Best Cinematography. With the video, Johnny Cash became the oldest artist ever nominated for an MTV Video Music Award. Justin Timberlake, who won Best Video that year for "Cry Me a River", said in his acceptance speech: "This is a travesty! I demand a recount. My grandfather raised me on Johnny Cash, and I think he deserves this more than any of us in here tonight."

Discography 

 Johnny Cash with His Hot and Blue Guitar! (1957)
 The Fabulous Johnny Cash (1958)
 Hymns by Johnny Cash (1959)
 Songs of Our Soil (1959)
 Now, There Was a Song! (1960)
 Ride This Train (1960)
 Hymns from the Heart (1962)
 The Sound of Johnny Cash (1962)
 Blood, Sweat and Tears (1963)
 The Christmas Spirit (1963)
 Keep on the Sunny Side  (1964)
 I Walk the Line (1964)
 Bitter Tears: Ballads of the American Indian (1964)
 Orange Blossom Special (1965)
 Johnny Cash Sings the Ballads of the True West (1965)
 Everybody Loves a Nut (1966)
 Happiness Is You (1966)
 Carryin' On with Johnny Cash & June Carter  (1967)
 From Sea to Shining Sea (1968)
 The Holy Land (1969)
 Hello, I'm Johnny Cash (1970)
 Man in Black (1971)
 A Thing Called Love (1972)
 America: A 200-Year Salute in Story and Song (1972)
 The Johnny Cash Family Christmas (1972)
 Any Old Wind That Blows (1973)
 Johnny Cash and His Woman  (1973)
 Ragged Old Flag (1974)
 The Junkie and the Juicehead Minus Me (1974)
 The Johnny Cash Children's Album (1975)
 Johnny Cash Sings Precious Memories (1975)
 John R. Cash (1975)
 Look at Them Beans (1975)
 One Piece at a Time (1976)
 The Last Gunfighter Ballad (1977)
 The Rambler (1977)
 I Would Like to See You Again (1978)
 Gone Girl (1978)
 Silver (1979)
 A Believer Sings the Truth (1979)
 Johnny Cash Sings with the BC Goodpasture Christian School (1979)
 Rockabilly Blues (1980)
 Classic Christmas (1980)
 The Baron (1981)
 The Adventures of Johnny Cash (1982)
 Johnny 99 (1983)
 Highwayman  (1985)
 Rainbow (1985)
 Heroes  (1986)
 Class of '55  (1986)
 Believe in Him (1986)
 Johnny Cash Is Coming to Town (1987)
 Classic Cash: Hall of Fame Series (1988)
 Water from the Wells of Home (1988)
 Boom Chicka Boom (1990)
 Highwayman 2  (1990)
 The Mystery of Life (1991)
 Country Christmas (1991)
 American Recordings (1994)
 The Road Goes on Forever  (1995)
 American II: Unchained (1996)
 American III: Solitary Man (2000)
 American IV: The Man Comes Around (2002)
 My Mother's Hymn Book (2004)
 American V: A Hundred Highways (2006)
 American VI: Ain't No Grave (2010)
 Out Among the Stars (2014)

Filmography

Film

Television

Published works 
 Man in Black: His Own Story in His Own Words, Zondervan, 1975; 
 Man in White, a novel about the Apostle Paul, HarperCollins, 1986; 
 Cash: The Autobiography, with Patrick Carr, HarperCollins, 1997; 
 Johnny Cash Reads the New Testament, Thomas Nelson, 2011; 
 Recollections by Johnny Cash, edited by daughter Tara, 2014; 
 The Man Who Carried Cash: Saul Holiff, Johnny Cash, and the Making of an American Icon by Julie Chadwick, Dundurn Press, 2017;

Notes

References

Bibliography 

 .
 
 .
 .
 .
 .
 .

Further reading 
 Antonio D'Ambrosio, A Heartbeat and a Guitar: Johnny Cash and the Making of Bitter Tears, New York/New York, Perseus Books/Nation Books, 2009,  (pb)
 Robert Hilburn, Johnny Cash: The Life, Back Bay Books, New York: Little Brown and Company, 2013,  (pb)
 Jonathan Silverman, Nine Choices: Johnny Cash and American Culture, Amherst: University of Massachusetts, 2010, 
 Graeme Thomson, The Resurrection of Johnny Cash: Hurt, Redemption, and American Recordings, Jawbone Press, 
 Christopher S. Wren, Johnny Cash: Winners Got Scars, Too, Abacus Editions,

External links 

 
 Sony Music's Johnny Cash website
 .
 
 
 Johnny Cash profile at martinguitar.com

 
1932 births
2003 deaths
20th-century American singers
21st-century American singers
Male actors from Arkansas
American autobiographers
American bass-baritones
American country guitarists
American country singer-songwriters
American folk guitarists
American folk singers
American rock singers
American male film actors
American male singer-songwriters
American male television actors
American male voice actors
American people of English descent
American people of Scottish descent
American performers of Christian music
American Christians
American Christian writers
American acoustic guitarists
American male guitarists
Deaths from diabetes
Outlaw country singers
Burials in Tennessee
Cash–Carter family
Charly Records artists
Columbia Records artists
Country Music Hall of Fame inductees
Country musicians from Arkansas
Grammy Legend Award winners
Grammy Lifetime Achievement Award winners
Grand Ole Opry members
Guitarists from Arkansas
Guitarists from Tennessee
Kennedy Center honorees
Members of the Country Music Association
Musicians from Nashville, Tennessee
Native Americans' rights activists
People from Cleveland County, Arkansas
People from Hendersonville, Tennessee
Rock and roll musicians
American rockabilly musicians
Blues musicians from Arkansas
Southern gospel performers
Sun Records artists
The Highwaymen (country supergroup) members
United States Air Force non-commissioned officers
20th-century American guitarists
20th-century American male actors
20th-century American male singers
Singer-songwriters from Tennessee
Singer-songwriters from Arkansas
The Tennessee Three members
The Great Eighties Eight members